The 2013–14 Guadalajara season was the 67th professional season of Mexico's top-flight football league. The season is split into two tournaments—the Torneo Apertura and the Torneo Clausura—each with identical formats and each contested by the same eighteen teams.

Squad

Torneo Apertura

Regular season

Apertura 2013 results

Copa MX

References

C.D. Guadalajara seasons
Guadalajara